Stenostomum is a genus of flowering plant in the family Rubiaceae, native from southern Mexico to tropical South America. The genus was established by Karl Friedrich von Gaertner in 1806.

Species
, Plants of the World Online accepted the following species:

Stenostomum abbreviatum (Urb.) Borhidi & M.Fernández
Stenostomum acreanum (K.Krause) Achille & Delprete
Stenostomum acutatum DC.
Stenostomum albobrunneum (Urb. & Ekman) Borhidi
Stenostomum apiculatum Britton & Standl.
Stenostomum aristatum Britton
Stenostomum aromaticum (Cast.-Campos & Lorence) Borhidi
Stenostomum baracoense Borhidi
Stenostomum biflorum Borhidi
Stenostomum cahosianum (Urb. & Ekman) Borhidi
Stenostomum coriaceum (Vahl) Griseb.
Stenostomum cuspidatum Borhidi
Stenostomum darienense (Dwyer) C.M.Taylor
Stenostomum densiflorum C.Wright ex Griseb.
Stenostomum ekmanii (Borhidi) Borhidi
Stenostomum ellipticum (Urb. & Ekman) Borhidi
Stenostomum granulatum Griseb.
Stenostomum guianensis (Bremek.) Delprete & Achille
Stenostomum heteroneurum (Urb. & Ekman) Borhidi
Stenostomum imbricatum Borhidi
Stenostomum involucratum (Urb. & Ekman) Borhidi
Stenostomum jamaicense (Urb.) Borhidi
Stenostomum lucidum (Sw.) C.F.Gaertn.
Stenostomum maestrense (Urb.) Borhidi & M.Fernández
Stenostomum minutifolium (Borhidi & Capote) Borhidi & M.Fernández
Stenostomum mucronatum (Urb.) Borhidi & M.Fernández
Stenostomum multinerve (Urb.) Borhidi & M.Fernández
Stenostomum myrtifolium Griseb.
Stenostomum nipense (Borhidi & O.Muñiz) Borhidi & M.Fernández
Stenostomum obtusifolium (Urb.) Britton & P.Wilson
Stenostomum occidentale (Urb.) Borhidi & M.Fernández
Stenostomum oliganthum (Urb.) Borhidi
Stenostomum ophiticola (Alain) Borhidi & M.Fernández
Stenostomum orbiculare (Alain) Borhidi & M.Fernández
Stenostomum pedicellare (Borhidi & Bisse) Borhidi & M.Fernández
Stenostomum pitonianum (Urb. & Ekman) Borhidi
Stenostomum portoricense Britton & P.Wilson
Stenostomum radiatum Griseb.
Stenostomum resinosum (Vahl) Griseb.
Stenostomum reticulare Borhidi & M.Fernández
Stenostomum revolutum Borhidi
Stenostomum rotundatum Griseb.
Stenostomum scrobiculatum (Urb.) Borhidi & M.Fernández
Stenostomum shaferi (Urb.) Borhidi & M.Fernández
Stenostomum sintenisii (Urb.) Britton & P.Wilson
Stenostomum tomentosum (Sw.) DC.
Stenostomum turrialbanum (N.Zamora & Poveda) C.M.Taylor
Stenostomum urbanianum (C.T.White) Borhidi & M.Fernández

References

Guettardeae
Rubiaceae genera